Howard Scott "Harry" Neil (13 September 1882 – 11 October 1952) was an Australian rules footballer who played with Collingwood and Richmond in the Victorian Football League (VFL).

Family
The son of John Isaac Neil (1846-), and Sarah Scott Neil (1860-1928), née Thompson, Howard Scott Neil was born at  Break O'Day, Victoria on 13 September 1882.

He married Elsie Cecilia Hopkinson (1889-1970) in 1911. They had six children.

Football

Collingwood (VFL)
He played in 4 senior games for Collingwood in 1904.

Prahran (VFA)
He transferred to Prahran in 1905, and played in his first senior match, against Footscray, on 10 June 1905.

Richmond (VFL)
In his three seasons with Richmond (1908-1910), he played in 31 senior matches.

Prahran (VFA)
In June 1910 he was cleared from Richmond to Prahran.

Brighton (VFA)
In May 1911, he was granted a permit to transfer from Prahran to Brighton.

Death
He died at Mont Park, Victoria on 11 October 1952.

Notes

References
 Hogan P: The Tigers Of Old, Richmond FC, (Melbourne), 1996.

External links 

 
 
 Harry Neil's profile at Collingwood Forever
 Harry Neil's playing statistics from The VFA Project

1882 births
1952 deaths
Australian rules footballers from Victoria (Australia)
Collingwood Football Club players
Richmond Football Club players
Prahran Football Club players
Brighton Football Club players